Grabovë Church is an Orthodox church dedicated to Saint Nicholas in Grabovë e Sipërme, Elbasan County, Albania. It is a Cultural Monument of Albania.

History
Built in the 18th century, the church follows the pattern of many Eastern Orthodox churches with its east-west axis. The masonry uses local stone and the roof is covered in roof tiles typical of the area. The church features a main nave by the entrance and both an outer nave to the south and a narthex to the west. The floor is built from stone slabs. Worshipers and other area residents are buried in and around the structure.

References

Cultural Monuments of Albania
Buildings and structures in Gramsh, Elbasan
Churches in Albania